Lesotho competed at the 2000 Summer Paralympics.  Making their Paralympic debut at the Sydney, Australia hosted Games, they were represented by two athletes.

Team 
Lesotho made their Paralympic debut at the 2000 Games. There were 1 female and 1 male athletes representing the country at the 2000 Summer Paralympics.

See also
2000 Summer Paralympics

References

Bibliography

External links
International Paralympic Committee

Nations at the 2000 Summer Paralympics
Paralympics
2000